Halfway, also known as Halfwayhouse, is a neighbourhood on the south-west side of the city of Glasgow, Scotland.

In 1926, Halfwayhouse and a handful of neighbouring villages including Cardonald, Hillington and Crookston were annexed to the ever-expanding city of Glasgow. This resulted in the renaming of many local roads to prevent duplication with ones in Glasgow.

Through the 1940s and 1950s, Halfwayhouse was developed significantly to the point where there is very little trace of the original village on what is still the main road between Glasgow and Paisley.

The area is bordered by two cemeteries: Craigton Cemetery to the north overlooked by the 1950s Moss Heights multi-storey apartments and Cardonald Cemetery to the south, adjoining the Mosspark neighbourhood.

References

Areas of Glasgow